The 1959 Georgia Bulldogs football team represented the Georgia Bulldogs of the University of Georgia during the 1959 NCAA University Division football season.

The Bulldogs won nine games in the regular season and lost only once, an early-season non-conference loss to South Carolina. Georgia's perfect conference record of 7-0, combined with conference losses by pre-season favorites LSU and 'Ole Miss', was enough to give the 'Dogs the Southeastern Conference Championship. They also earned a trip to the Orange Bowl, where they beat Missouri 14-0.

The highlight of the regular season was a come-from-behind win over Auburn to clinch the championship. Trailing the Tigers 13-7 with less than 40 seconds left in the game, The Bulldogs scored on a fourth-down fourteen -yard touchdown pass from Quarterback Fran Tarkenton to End Bill Herron. Kicker Durward Pennington converted the extra point and Georgia won the game by a score of 14-13.

Schedule

Source: GeorgiaDogs.com: 1959 football schedule

Roster
QB Fran Tarkenton, Jr.
G Pat Dye Jr.
HB Fred Brown Jr.
HB/P Bobby Walden Jr.-
K Durward Pennington Soph.
FB Bill Godfrey Soph.
E Jimmy Vickers 
E Aaron Box
E Bill Herron
QB Charley Britt Sr.
C 'Dude' Thompson Sr.
Fred Farah Sr.
G Billy Roland
HB Don Soberdash Sr. (Team Captain)

References

Georgia
Georgia Bulldogs football seasons
Southeastern Conference football champion seasons
Orange Bowl champion seasons
Georgia Bulldogs football